João Pedro Fortes Bachiessa (born 1 May 1998) known as João Batxi, is a footballer who plays for Russian Premier League club Krasnodar as a forward. Born in Portugal, he plays for the Angola national team.

Club career
He made his professional debut for Chaves on 16 November 2019 in  the Taça da Liga.

On 7 September 2022, Batxi signed a three-year contract with the Russian Premier League club Krasnodar.

International career
Born in Portugal, Batxi is of Angolan descent. He was called up to represent the Angola national football team for matches in September 2021. He debuted with Angola in a 1–0 2022 FIFA World Cup qualification loss to Egypt on 1 September 2021.

Career statistics

References

External links

1998 births
People from Sintra
Sportspeople from Lisbon District
Portuguese sportspeople of Angolan descent
Living people
Portuguese footballers
Angolan footballers
Angola international footballers
Association football forwards
G.D. Chaves players
FC Krasnodar players
Campeonato de Portugal (league) players
Liga Portugal 2 players
Primeira Liga players
Russian Premier League players
Angolan expatriate footballers
Expatriate footballers in Russia
Angolan expatriate sportspeople in Russia